Abu Mina orthonairovirus, also called Abu Mina virus (ABMV), is a species of virus in the genus Orthonairovirus. This virus has not been reported to cause disease in humans.

References 

Nairoviridae